Franz Schneider may refer to:

 Franz Schneider (engineer), Swiss engineer and aircraft designer
 Franz Schneider (chemist) (1812–1897), Austrian physician and chemist
 Franz Schneider (spy) Courier for the Soviet Red Orchestra